Facebook Hacker Cup (also known as the Meta Hacker Cup) is an annual international programming competition hosted and administered by Facebook. The competition began in 2011 as a means to identify top engineering talent for potential employment at Facebook.  The competition consists of a set of algorithmic problems which must be solved in a fixed amount of time. Competitors may use any programming language and development environment to write their solutions.

Facebook Hacker Cup is part of a circuit of annual international programming contests that includes Google Code Jam, Topcoder Open, and the ACM International Collegiate Programming Contest. It has been featured in articles from Bloomberg and Stack Overflow.

Past winners 

 The 2020 Hacker Cup Finals and the 2021 Hacker Cup Finals were held in an online format in response to the COVID-19 pandemic.

Results by country

See also 
 Google Code Jam
 Online judge
 Topcoder Open

References

External links
 Facebook Hacker Cup
Programming contests
Facebook
2011 establishments